Moira Jane Houston (born 1961), is a female former swimmer who competed for England.

Swimming career
In 1976 Moira became a double National champion after winning the ASA National Championship 200 metres freestyle and 400 metres freestyle. She also represented England in the 200 metres freestyle and the 200 and 400 metres medley events, at the 1978 Commonwealth Games in Edmonton, Alberta, Canada.

References

1961 births
English female swimmers
Swimmers at the 1978 Commonwealth Games
Living people
Commonwealth Games competitors for England